John Holland may refer to:

Academics
John L. Holland (1919–2008), American psychologist and professor of sociology at Johns Hopkins University
John Henry Holland (1929–2015), American scientist and professor of psychology and professor of electrical engineering and computer science at the University of Michigan

Arts
John Holland (poet) (1794–1872), English poet, newspaper editor, and writer on coal and metallurgy
John Gill Holland (born 1964), American film producer
John Holland (psychic) (born 1964), American author and psychic medium
John Holland (actor, born 1899) (1899–1971), American film actor
John Holland (actor, born 1908) (1908–1993), American film and television actor

Athletics
John Holland (American football) (born 1952), American football player
John Holland (athlete) (1926–1990), New Zealand athlete
John Holland (baseball executive) (1910–1979), American general manager of the Chicago Cubs, 1956–1975
John Holland (basketball) (born 1988), American professional basketball player
John Holland (canoeist) (born 1952), American slalom canoer
John Holland (cricketer) (1869–1914), English cricketer
Jack Holland (footballer, born 1861) (John Henry Holland, 1861–1898), English footballer who played for Notts County
John Holland (footballer) (born 1953), Maltese international footballer
Johnny Holland (born 1965), American football player
Jon Holland (born 1987), Australian cricketer

Business and engineering
John Holland (banker) (died 1722), founder of the Bank of Scotland in 1695, the central bank of the Kingdom of Scotland
Sir John Holland (engineer) (1914–2009), Australian engineer, founder of John Holland Group
John Holland Group, Australian construction company
John J. Holland (1843–1892), American shipbuilder
John Holland (pen maker) (1838–1917), businessman and industrialist

Military
John Vincent Holland (1889–1975), British Army officer, and recipient of the Victoria Cross
John Philip Holland (1841–1914), designed submarines for the U.S. Navy and Royal Navy
John Frederick Holland (c. 1764–1845), army officer, surveyor and political figure in Prince Edward Island

Politics, law, and government
Sir John Holland, 1st Baronet (1603–1701), English politician
Sir John Holland, 2nd Baronet (c. 1669–by July 1724), British politician
John Holland, on the Los Angeles County Civil Defense and Disaster Commission in 1960s
John C. Holland (1893–1970), councilman in the Los Angeles City Council, 1943–1966
John Robert Holland, American civil rights lawyer, volunteered to serve as a lawyer to four Guantanamo captives
John W. Holland (1883–1969), judge

Religion
John Christie Holland (1882–1954), Canadian pastor and the first Canadian of African heritage to be named a "Citizen of the Year"
John Holland (bishop) (1912–1990), Anglican bishop in New Zealand

Royalty
John Holland, 1st Duke of Exeter (c. 1352–1400), half-brother to Richard II of England and second husband of Elizabeth Plantagenet, daughter of John of Gaunt
John Holland, 2nd Duke of Exeter (1395–1447), his son

See also
Jack Holland (disambiguation)
Jonathan Holland (disambiguation)